Lioy is a surname. Notable people with the surname include:

Paolo Lioy (1834–1911), Italian naturalist, redshirt patriot and politician
 Paul J. Lioy (1947–2015), United States environmental health scientist

See also 

 Loy